The IGI Airport Metro Station is located on the Delhi Airport Express Line of the Delhi Metro. This station is linked to the Indira Gandhi International Airport  terminal 2 and 3. The station was inaugurated on 23 February 2011.

Alternate rail access to the airport
The closest Indian Railways station is Shahabad Mohammadpur (SMDP).  Also within distance is Palam Railway Station (PM).

See also

 Terminal 1-IGI Airport metro station
 Hyderabad Airport Metro Express
 Chennai International Airport metro station

References
  

Delhi Metro stations
Railway stations in India opened in 2011
Airport railway stations in India
Railway stations in South West Delhi district